2-Carbomethoxytropinone (2-CMT) is a commonly used organic intermediate in the synthesis of cocaine and its analogues. As of at least 1999 no reaction pathway has been discovered that synthesizes cocaine-like compounds without utilizing the reduction of 2-CMT. The structure of cocaine was discovered by Richard Willstätter in 1898 after he synthesized it from 2-carbomethoxytropinone. Although it was originally believed that 2-CMT in nature was ultimately derived from ornithine and acetic acid, subsequent research has indicated other pathways exist for the biosynthesis of 2-CMT.  A β-keto ester, 2-CMT exists in equilibrium with its keto–enol tautomer.

Synthesis
2-CMT (3) can be synthesized from 1,3-acetonedicarboxylate anhydride (1) by methanolysis followed by reaction with methylamine and succinaldehyde.

See also
 Tropinone

References

Tropanes
Ketones
Methyl esters